The Highway 53 or Miller Trunk Corridor refers to a large agglomeration of retail development in Duluth, Minnesota on and around U.S. Highway 53, and by extension, State Highway 194 (Central Entrance), and parts of the Arrowhead, Haines, and Maple Grove Roads. The Miller Hill Mall is the most visible of the corridor's anchors, although not the first.

Most chain stores and restaurants present in Duluth are found in the corridor, although numerous local businesses are present as well.

Criticisms

Many Duluthians and area residents consider the corridor to be an example of poor and unplanned development.  While not serious by the standards of larger cities, traffic congestion is considerably more pronounced than in other parts of the city, the development is often considered to have taken on an undesirable "suburban sprawl" character, and the design of the area is very car-oriented, making the area highly undesirable for foot navigation. Sidewalks are limited and inconvenient, and distances between buildings are large, despite the tightly packed development of the core part. Pedestrians (outside of the indoor shopping mall) and cyclists are few in the corridor.

Big-box stores

Barnes & Noble (Miller Hill Mall)
Best Buy (Burning Tree Plaza)
Cub Foods
Dick's Sporting Goods
Dollar Tree
Gander Mountain (free-standing)
Harbor Freight (Burning Tree Plaza)
Hobby Lobby 
HOM Furniture (free-standing)
Home Depot (free-standing)
Kohl's (free standing)
Menards (free-standing)
Michaels
Northern Tool
OfficeMax (Stone Ridge Center)
Petco (Stone Ridge Center)
PetSmart (shares building with Savers and Hobby Lobby)
Pier 1 Imports
Sam's Club (free-standing)
Savers
Schneiderman's Furniture (free-standing)
Shopko (Stone Ridge Center)
Slumberland (free-standing)
Target (free-standing)
TJMaxx (Burning Tree Plaza)
Wal-Mart Supercenter (free-standing)

Chain restaurants

Applebee's
Buffalo Wild Wings
Grizzly's
Ground Round
Old Country Buffet
Olive Garden
Outback Steakhouse
Perkins
Texas Roadhouse

There are numerous other restaurants in the Miller Hill Mall food court.

Local restaurants

 Aztecas Mexican Grill
 Bridgeman's
 China Star
 Grandma's
 Maya (Mexican)
 Zen House

Fast food restaurants
Burger King
Caribou Coffee
Cold Stone Creamery
Culver's 
Dairy Queen Grill & Chill
Five Guys Burgers and Fries
McDonald's
Noodles & Company
Starbucks
Subway
Taco Bell
Taco John's
Wendy's

Chain retailers

Beauty Mart
Bender's Shoes
Cartridge World
Cash Wise Liquor
Catherine's Plus Sizes
Chico's
David's Bridal
Fantastic Sam's
GameStop
Great Clips
Hancock Fabrics
Men's Warehouse
Midas
Party America
Pearle Vision
Plato's Closet
Regency Beauty Institute
Schmidt Music
Sprint Nextel
Talbot's
Tires Plus
Valvoline Instant Oil Change
Walgreens

Lodging

Country Inn & Suites
Days Inn
Econo Lodge
Fairfield Inn by Marriott
Residence Inn by Marriott

Strip malls

Burning Tree Plaza
Matterhorn Mall
Stone Ridge Shopping Center
Village Square Mall

References

External links
Mn/DOT Miller Trunk Corridor Project

Duluth, Minnesota
U.S. Route 53